Ocean View, California may refer to:
Albany, California, named Ocean View from 1908-1909
Ocean View, Berkeley, California
Ocean View, San Francisco, California